The 2018 American Athletic Conference women's soccer tournament is the postseason women's soccer tournament for the American Athletic Conference held from October 31 to November 4, 2018. The five-match tournament will take place at the home field of the regular season champion. The six-team single-elimination tournament consisted of three rounds based on seeding from regular season conference play. The South Florida Bulls are the defending tournament champions. The Memphis Tiger's win was the program's first and also the first for coach Brooks Monaghan.

Bracket

Source:

Schedule

First round

Semifinals

Final

Statistics

Goalscorers 
2 Goals
 Clarissa Larisey – Memphis
 Kristen Scott – UCF

1 Goal
 Marie Levassuer – Memphis
 Aubrey Megrath – South Florida
 Erin Mikalsen – East Carolina
 Stefanie Sanders – UCF
 Allie Thornton – SMU
 Evelyne Veins – South Florida

Source:

See also 
 2018 American Athletic Conference Men's Soccer Tournament

References 

 
American Athletic Conference Women's Soccer Tournament